Halo 5: Guardians is a 2015 first-person shooter video game developed by 343 Industries, published by Microsoft Studios, and released worldwide for the Xbox One game console on October 27, 2015. The plot follows two fireteams of human supersoldiers: Blue Team, led by Master Chief, and Fireteam Osiris, led by Spartan Locke. When Blue Team goes absent without leave to track down the artificial intelligence construct Cortana, Master Chief's loyalty is called into question and Fireteam Osiris is sent to retrieve him.

343 Industries started to plan Halo 5 shortly after the release of its predecessor, Halo 4. In late 2012, the team set goals for the game, including larger campaign and multiplayer areas. Like Halo 4, it uses motion capture for character animation. It features new abilities and character designs, but does not feature any offline capabilities or local networking. It has a game engine that scales its resolution to maintain a frame rate of 60 frames per second. Unlike the first four mainline games, this is the first mainline game to receive a "Teen" rating from the ESRB.

Microsoft announced the game at E3 2013. The game sold 5 million units within 3 months but despite this, it had the lowest opening sales of any Halo game in Japan and the UK. Upon release, Halo 5 received positive reviews from critics, with praise directed at its gameplay, visuals, level design and multiplayer modes. However, the game's single-player campaign met divided responses, with criticism directed at its story, writing, and ending. A sequel, Halo Infinite, was released on December 8, 2021.

Gameplay

Halo 5: Guardians is a first-person shooter, with players experiencing most gameplay through the eyes of a playable character. The camera switches to a third-person view for some cinematics and gameplay sequences.

The game preserves many of the core features of the Halo franchise's gameplay experience. Players step into the powered armor of a Spartan. The game modifies character movement and abilities compared to previous games. New to the series are "Spartan Abilities", replacing the Armor Abilities of previous games. Players are equipped with thruster packs they can use to dash in any direction, sprint, charge, slide across surfaces, and clamber up ledges. A "ground pound" sends an airborne player crashing to the ground, dealing damage to enemies in the landing zone. Old weapons return alongside new ones, sometimes with altered mechanics. All firearms can be zoomed in, a capability restricted to specific weapons in previous games. When zoomed in while airborne, the player can hover off the ground for a short period.

The game's story-based campaign mode has the player assume the roles of two different protagonists, the Master Chief and Jameson Locke. Each character is accompanied by a persistent fireteam of non-player character Spartans—Blue Team for Chief, and Fireteam Osiris for Locke—who are present at all times. During cooperative play, other players assume control of these Spartans, who each have different loadouts and attributes. Players can control their AI fireteam members with simple directions via the d-pad; for example, picking up a weapon, getting into a vehicle, or prioritizing a selected enemy. If any Spartan takes too much damage, they enter an incapacitated state, and can be revived by another fireteam member before dying. The game's difficulty scales to compensate for the number of human players.

Xbox Live multiplayer features a variety of competitive and cooperative game modes. Classic four-versus-four arena modes like deathmatch or capture the flag return. New to Halo 5 is Warzone, a 24-player game mode that pit two teams against each other. In addition to fighting the enemy team, players can earn points by capturing locations on the map or defeating AI bosses; the game ends either when one team destroys the other team's home base, or they earn 1000 points. Players earn REQ points over the course of a match, which can be used to summon better weapons or vehicles into the map based on requisitions the player has earned from REQ packs. These packs can be earned in-game via a progression system, or else bought with real-world currency. Unlike previous first-person shooters in the Halo franchise, Halo 5 does not feature any offline multiplayer capabilities, like split-screen cooperative campaign and multiplayer modes, and has no local networking options. The game was supported via the Halo Waypoint website with player statistics tracking and additional features such as Spartan Companies, where players could band together in groups of up to 100 players and work on completing challenges to unlock cosmetic rewards.

The Forge map-making mode is expanded in capabilities, with a new control scheme compared to the mode in Halo 4, and new scripting tools that can be applied to game objects.

Synopsis

Setting and characters
Halo 5: Guardians takes place in the year 2558, eight months after the events of Halo 4. The game follows the Spartan fireteams Blue and Osiris. Blue Team is led by Master Chief Petty Officer John-117 and is comprised of his fellow Spartan-II supersoldiers: Linda-058, an elite sniper; Kelly-087, a scout; and Frederic-104, a hand-to-hand combat specialist. The members of Blue Team are among the last Spartan-IIs left alive. Fireteam Osiris is formed from Spartan-IVs, a newer generation of Spartan supersoldiers. Osiris is led by Jameson Locke, a former assassin and tracker of the Office of Naval Intelligence (ONI). The other members of Fireteam Osiris are: Holly Tanaka, a combat technician and engineer in the UNSC Army and a survivor of a Covenant attack on her world; Olympia Vale, a political liaison and signals intelligence agent with ONI who can speak many of the Covenant's dialects; and Edward Buck, a veteran former Orbital Drop Shock Trooper, who was a main character in Halo 3: ODST.

Supporting characters include Infinitys commanding officer, Captain Thomas Lasky; Spartan Commander Sarah Palmer, head of operations for all Spartan IV teams on board Infinity; Roland, Infinitys shipboard AI, and Dr. Catherine Halsey, a scientist who created the SPARTAN-II program. Other returning characters include the Arbiter Thel 'Vadam, now leading the Sangheili species against a Covenant remnant faction, led by Jul 'Mdama. Cortana, Master Chief's former AI companion who was presumed dead after the events of Halo 4, also returns.

Plot
Fireteam Osiris is deployed to the planet Kamchatka, occupied by Jul 'Mdama's Covenant faction, to retrieve the rogue Dr. Halsey amidst a battle between Covenant forces and Forerunner Prometheans. Halsey claims to have information on a series of devastating attacks on several human worlds. The team is successful in retrieving Halsey and eliminating 'Mdama. Elsewhere, the Master Chief leads Blue Team on a mission to secure a derelict ONI research station; the arrival of a Covenant fleet prompts Blue Team to scuttle the station instead. The Chief receives a cryptic message from Cortana, directing him to the planet Meridian. John is ordered to return to Infinity upon destroying the station, but he and Blue Team disobey orders and set out after Cortana.

Captain Lasky declares the rogue Spartans as AWOL; Halsey believes that Cortana's survival through the use of Forerunner technology makes her unpredictable and untrustworthy. Fireteam Osiris is sent to Meridian to bring in Blue Team. On the planet, they find the colonists under attack by Promethean forces. Following Blue Team's trail, they encounter the Warden Eternal, a Promethean serving as Cortana's enforcer. After temporarily defeating the Warden, Osiris catches up to Blue Team, ordering them to stand down and return to Infinity. Chief bests Locke in hand-to-hand combat and flees with the rest of Blue Team as they board a Guardian, one of several colossal Forerunner constructs built as enforcers of entire worlds. Osiris barely escape the colony's collapse as the Guardian activates and disappears. The Guardian emerges on the Forerunner planet Genesis, where John and Cortana reunite. Cortana says that her terminal rampancy was cured by the same Forerunner technology that had saved her.

Osiris is deployed to the Sangheili homeworld of Sanghelios, where they plan to use the Guardian that is buried there to follow Blue Team. Sanghelios is embroiled in a war between the Arbiter's forces and the remaining Covenant; Osiris helps Arbiter attack the Covenant and boards the Guardian before it disappears.

On Genesis, Osiris encounters the planet's caretaker, the artificial intelligence 031 Exuberant Witness, who allies with them to stop Cortana. Osiris catches up to Blue Team, who reveals that Cortana is planning on using the Guardians to achieve galactic peace through forcible disarmament. Master Chief, aware of the massive devastation that Cortana's plan will cause, attempts to convince Cortana to stand down. She refuses and confines Blue Team in a Forerunner prison in order to prevent them from interfering with her plan. Osiris manages to transfer control of Genesis back to Exuberant, who wrests the prison from Cortana as she leaves the planet via a Guardian.

Artificial intelligences across the galaxy begin swearing allegiance to Cortana and her plans. Cortana locates Infinity and prepares to disable it, but Lasky has the ship's AI Roland, who is still loyal to Infinity, engage slipspace away from Earth and commit to random jumps until they can develop a way to combat Cortana. With Blue Team recovered, Osiris returns to Sanghelios to reunite the SPARTAN-IIs with an injured Commander Palmer, Thel 'Vadam, and Halsey.

In a post-credits scene, unlocked via completing the campaign on the "Legendary" difficulty, Halo Installation 07 begins to power up while Cortana hums.

Development

Even before Halo 4s release, creative director Josh Holmes began looking for his replacement for the next Halo title, being more interested in building 343 Industries after telling his story with Halo 4. Tim Longo joined as creative director in late 2012, with Halo 5 a few months into preproduction. General manager Bonnie Ross recalled that after Halo 4 the team spent a lot of time discussing where they wanted to take the Halo series, reflecting on feedback from fans about what they did and did not like. Longo and game leads David Berger and Chris Lee laid out the studio's vision for the next game from a creative and technical standpoint, setting key goals to focus on: utilizing the Xbox One's hardware and Microsoft's cloud infrastructure for larger campaign and multiplayer spaces, deeper player investment systems, and a frame rate of 60 frames per second (FPS).

One of the main goals for Halo 5: Guardians was to expand the universe. Longo was a fan of squad-based gameplay experiences, and the team wanted to introduce more main characters besides Master Chief, and explore the character through other perspectives. "One of the early thoughts was kind of throwing the Chief paradigm a little bit on its head, to have some mystery enshrouding him and what his motivations are, like we'd not seen before," Longo recalled, setting up the idea of a hunt for Master Chief across multiple locations, with alternating viewpoints similar to Halo 2. To achieve this, the studio introduced characters from the expanded fiction with Blue Team, and decided to create another team of characters to act as a contrast. 343 initially considered making this group Fireteam Majestic, characters from the Halo 4 episodic series Spartan Ops. When Longo joined as creative director and the rest of the story developed, the developers decided that Majestic was the wrong team to use and set out to create a new fireteam, initially composed of three Spartans dubbed "Smith", "Jones", and "Brown". Initially, none of these characters' traits—not even their genders—were determined. The narrative team decided Smith (later Locke) would be a former intelligence agent, a cross of James Bond and Lara Croft. At one point they added Halo 4 characters Gabriel Thorne and Sarah Palmer, while the still-unnamed Jones (later Vesper) would be an expert in alien languages.

Once part of the story became set on the planet Meridian, the narrative team decided that one of the Spartans should have grown up outside the UNSC and survived the destruction of her home planet to act as a conduit for understanding Meridian; this character, now known as Spartan Song, replaced Palmer. When Thorne's actor, Ethan Peck, was unavailable due to scheduling conflicts, 343 Industries decided to replace his character on the team roster rather than recast the role. Other suggestions included an entirely new Spartan or a member of Blue Team, but the developers decided on fan favorite Buck after Nathan Fillion became available. Spartan Smith became Spartan Locke, Vesper and Song became Vale and Tanaka, and Fireteam Osiris took shape after more than two years of changes.

To support the drop-in/drop-out co-op, 343 Industries built a dynamic AI system for the fireteam companions to assist the player when a session is played alone.

Speaking about Cortana's fate in Halo 4, O'Connor stated that Halo 4s story was focused on the effect that Cortana's sacrifice and loss would have on the Master Chief. He also noted that this effect would be reflected in Halo 5: Guardians, with a story that explores how the Master Chief copes with loss and memories.

The game uses motion capture to animate characters, following its use in Halo 4. To record the performances, it used a 5,000-square-foot stage and fifty cameras, along with a 3D tracking system called OptiTrack.

On the departure from the Xbox 360 hardware, Ross noted that the Xbox One allows 343 Industries to broaden the game's scope, as its matchmaking and four-player online campaign co-op modes utilize the console's dedicated server support. Franchise development director Frank O'Connor explained that Halo 4 pushed its game engine to the limit, such that moving on to the Xbox One called for the development of a new engine.

To maintain a frame rate of 60 FPS, Halo 5s engine uses a "progressive resolution system", which automatically lowers the resolution at which the game is rendered during graphically intensive scenes, which are then upscaled back to the game's native resolution of 1080p. Art lead Justin Dinges explained that "some sections of a mission might be relatively quiet and achieving 60fps is straightforward, but there are many situations where we dial the intensity up to 11. At those times, we need to maintain 60fps and give players the total experience from both a design and artistic perspective". To achieve this, 343 Industries made extensive use of Havok.

Eager to take advantage of the hardware, the art team built fully animated cacti that responded to gunfire, blanketing the campaign maps with the succulents. Ultimately, they proved to be the largest single technical problem in the game and had to be removed.

Art
Halo 4s art director, Kenneth Scott, stepped down from his role in January 2014. He was succeeded by Nicolas "Sparth" Bouvier, a concept artist who joined Microsoft in 2009. Bouvier described the early stages of developing artistic concepts as akin to sculpting from marble: "[we] start with a very loose idea that has trickled down from the writers or studio creative director and begin chipping away at the problem." Concept artist Kory Lynn Hubbell recalled that the game's art had to be justified. "If there's no plausible story behind something, it shouldn't be there," he said, recalling that an original plan for a fountain on the mining world of Meridian was changed to a holographic tree, to reflect the desire to simulate nature in the barren landscape.

343's artist and designers focused on differentiating the members of each Spartan fireteam through their design. As Locke's mission is to find Master Chief, Bouvier recalled "he reflects that visually. The design of his armor is very nonintrusive. He doesn't have any bright tones. He's gray and dark to amplify the very nondisruptive nature of his armor." In comparison, Vale's armor was sleeker to reflect her agility, and painted magenta to imply nervousness and aggression.

Audio

Sataro Tojima was the audio director for Halo 5: Guardians, with Japanese composer Kazuma Jinnouchi composing the original score. The music was recorded at Abbey Road Studios in London and the choir was recorded at the Rudolfinum in Prague. Jinnouchi wanted to reintroduce the original Halo theme in Halo 5: Guardians, so he composed his own interpretation of the piece. A larger emphasis has been placed on the use of a choir in Halo 5: Guardians music than Halo 4s.

For the first time in Halos multiplayer, teammates can make voiced callouts. Jul's Covenant faction have conversations. The audio team worked closely with the AI and narrative departments when developing the Blue Team and Team Osiris in the campaign.

The game's soundtrack was released on October 30, 2015, in four editions: a digital release, physical compact disc, vinyl, and limited edition featuring double compact discs, vinyl, and extra multimedia content.

Multiplayer

Executive producer, Josh Holmes stated that the development team wanted to provide much gameplay variety and support different play styles in multiplayer. On launch, the game will include over twenty multiplayer maps, and the team plans to provide an additional fifteen maps as free downloadable content by June 2016. 343 Industries chose to make additional maps freely available as they did not want to divide the player base.

In Halo 5: Guardians Arena mode, 343 Industries decided to exclude a loadout system so they could encourage the concept of a level playing field that was present in earlier Halo games. The mode was inspired by older multiplayer shooters such as Quake.

Warzone, one of the new multiplayer modes, was originally conceived in 2012 with a small demo set up as a four-versus-four player match with AI controlled enemies defending an objective. Initially, the studio wanted to implement such a mode with Halo 4 on the Xbox 360 but they were unable to achieve their vision.

A multiplayer beta for Halo 5: Guardians launched on December 29, 2014, and ran for three weeks. The beta was a sample of Halo 5: Guardians Arena gameplay, featuring three modes, seven maps and eleven weapons. The development team wanted to launch a beta as early as possible so that players could test and give feedback on new gameplay elements. This player feedback was used to make refinements to gameplay and adjustments to maps. The beta used dedicated servers.

Promotion

At Electronic Entertainment Expo (E3) 2013, Microsoft announced a new, untitled addition to the Halo series with a trailer showing Master Chief. After E3, Phil Spencer said the previously announced "Reclaimer Trilogy" had been expanded into a longer series of games, explaining that the developers "[didn't] want to limit the Reclaimer story within a trilogy". Ross confirmed the game's title and 2015 release date in a May 2014 blog post. The game is exclusive to the Xbox One.

Halo: The Master Chief Collection gave players exclusive access to the Halo 5: Guardians multiplayer beta, which ran from December 29, 2014, through January 18, 2015. In response to the negative coverage of The Master Chief Collections launch, 343 insisted Halo 5 would do better.

Live-action advertisements on television revealed the October 27, 2015, release date of Halo 5: Guardians. In its June 2015 cover story featuring the title, Game Informer revealed that the campaign would feature four-player cooperative gameplay, and that its story would center on Blue Team, led by Master Chief, and Fireteam Osiris, led by Spartan Locke. The magazine also revealed that Fireteam Osiris would include Holly Tanaka, a new character named Olympia Vale, and fan favorite Edward Buck from Halo 3: ODST.

On the multiplayer side, it was revealed that there would be a new map called Fathom and that there would be changes to Empire, a map playable in the beta. A new mode that would combine all of the sandbox (later revealed as Warzone at E3 2015) was hinted at, and it was revealed that the game would feature 20 maps at launch and that 15 downloadable maps would be added later for free.

Halo 5 was also marketed in sports events: Major League Soccer club Seattle Sounders FC wore jerseys with the game's ads; and Dale Earnhardt Jr. and Jamie McMurray drove in the NASCAR competition in Halo 5-themed cars.

Campaign gameplay was shown at E3 2015.

A documentary series about the development of the game, The Sprint, debuted on the Xbox One's Halo Channel and was later uploaded to YouTube. The first season was about the development of Halo 5s multiplayer; the second season focused on the development of the Warzone game mode, and additional tweaks for the presentation at E3 2015. The third season showed the development of the game's score and the use of motion capture.

One fan in Australia was tapped to play the game from a helicopter while an aerial screen broadcast the gameplay from 2,000 feet up.

Tie-in merchandise included Halo 5-themed Minecraft skins.

Hunt the Truth

On March 22, 2015, Microsoft launched Hunt the Truth, an audioplay similar to radio series such as This American Life. The first season followed the investigations of fictional journalist and war photographer Benjamin Giraud (voiced by Keegan-Michael Key), who investigates the Master Chief's background. Giraud discovers that the official story of Master Chief's origins are false, and attempts to expose the coverup.

The first season was highly successful, drawing an audience of 6.7 million listeners on iTunes and winning Hunt the Truths ad agency a Clio Award. A second season of the podcast began September 22, 2015, focusing upon the view point of ONI Agent Maya Sankar (Janina Gavankar), returning undercover as FERO, to investigate unidentified attacks on human colonies.

Release
Halo 5 released worldwide on October 27, 2015. In the United States, it was the first shooter in the franchise to receive a Teen rating from the Entertainment Software Rating Board, instead of a Mature rating. Microsoft executive Aaron Greenberg felt that the M ratings on previous installments were surprising given the comparative lack of graphic violence, but that the Teen rating gave Halo 5 a larger potential audience. The game shipped in a standard edition, limited edition, and collector's edition. The limited edition came with a REQ bundle, dossiers on the game's characters, the Fall of Reach film, a statue of a Guardian, and a "steelbook" metal case. The collector's edition contained the limited edition extras, plus a commemorative statue of Master Chief and Agent Locke. The collector's edition comes with a digital code rather than a physical disc; fan feedback led Microsoft to offer a limited-time free trade-in program so buyers could have a physical disc instead.

Post-release
Halo 5 was supported by free post-release content updates that added new features, weapons, and multiplayer maps. Holmes explained that the studio did not want to segregate the player base by distributing maps as paid downloadable content.

A Windows PC version of the game's map editing tool and multiplayer, Halo 5: Forge, was released for Windows 10 on September 8, 2016. The game was later updated in 2017 to run at 4K resolutions on the Xbox One X.

Professional competition
In 2014, Microsoft announced the "Halo Championship Series", its own tournament. Prior to Halo 5: Guardianss release, Microsoft announced a competition with a  prize pool, and a focus on developing the game with competition in mind. At The Game Awards in early December, Microsoft announced a  prize pool, buoyed by sales of a special REQ pack. By February 19, the total prize pool exceeded . The Halo World Championship began on December 6, 2015, with the finals running March 18–20, 2016.

After the Halo World Championship, Microsoft announced the Halo Pro League in partnership with Electronic Sports League as a way to grow Halo esports.

Reception

Halo 5: Guardians received an aggregated score of 84 out of 100 on Metacritic based on 101 reviews, indicating "generally favorable reviews".

Arthur Gies, writing for Polygon, wrote that 343 Industries had much to prove with Halo 5 after Halo 4s online population "evaporated", The Master Chief Collections woes, and Microsoft's need for a strong title to sell more Xbox One units. "343's response to that quagmire," Gies wrote, "[is] to return to the fundamentals of what made the series great in the first place. The studio has brought Halos mechanics kicking and screaming into the modern era, while providing the most bombastic, co-op-driven campaign in Halo history." GameSpots Mike Mahardy agreed that 343 had produced some of the best iterations of the game series' facets with Halo 5. IGN's Brian Albert opined that 343 Industries had created an even bigger game than previous entries, with "the strongest combat Halo has ever seen". Destructoids Chris Carter felt that Halo 5 failed to grab him in the same way as previous games had, "but those of you who are still content with Master Chief and his wacky adventures across the galaxy will likely walk away satisfied." More critically, the reviewers of GamesTM felt that Halo 5 was "sheepish and safe" and represented a series low.

Halo 5s overall gameplay and multiplayer were well received. GameSpot praised Halo 5s multiplayer experience for being in the "best shape Halos multiplayer has ever taken", and in particular, noting the game's return to "universal" weapon loadouts and obtaining stronger weapons spawning on-map, rather than unlocking weapons as in Halo 4. The Warzone mode was considered to be one of the "best new ideas" in both the Halo franchise and the genre, praising its MOBA-like mechanics and vast environments, explaining that "as with the rest of Halo 5, there is momentum here—but this is a force that shifts from side to side with each match. Warzone isn't so much about consistency—it's about adaptability. And the team that can roll with the punches, and punch back at the right moments, will have the upper hand." Albert praised the campaign for challenging enemies and environments dense with secret pathways and hidden weapons. "This kind of design makes Halo 5'''s campaign ripe for replaying, and well suited for the [...] co-op it's clearly made for", he wrote.

The game's artificial intelligence (AI) received mixed impressions. Chris Carter found the squad controls rudimentary, but found the team chatter and their assistance welcome. GamesTM pointed out flaws in enemies by criticizing overpowered bosses and saying that "the number of things that can kill you instantly—even on Normal difficulty—is exasperatingly high". Reviewers like Carter and GamesTM complained of ally teammates failing to revive players, even in instances such as when they were standing right next to the player.Halo 5s campaign and story received mixed to negative reviews. Timothy J. Seppala of Engadget felt it was the first time in years that the campaign felt like a step backward compared to its predecessor; "instead of addressing what it got wrong with [Halo 4] and doubling down on what it did right, the team fundamentally altered how a Halo campaign works to horrendous results." Times Matt Peckham felt that in comparison to the setup in Halo 5s marketing and the Hunt the Truth series, which suggested a novel direction for the series, "What happens in Halo 5s story, by contrast, feels disappointingly by the numbers." GameSpot's Mike Mahardy felt that while the plot had promise, the campaign did not effectively capitalize on its opportunities: "Cutscenes fade to black before they feel finished. Character motivations shift on a whim." Forbes Paul Thier and GamesRadar's David Houghton complained that players did not suitably impact the story's progression, and that the game's cliffhanger ended the plot at the conclusion of the first act. Though he also found fault with parts of Halo 5s campaign, Albert praised Cortana's threat as "less black and white" in motives than previous antagonists, and the background chatter contributing to learning more about each character.

The game's mainstream marketing received some criticism for being different from the game's plot. Phil Hornshaw of Digital Trends wrote that Halo 5s marketing "suggests an emotional conflict between the questionably-loyal Chief and the 'traitor-hunting' Osiris leader, Locke, but those moments are barely in the game". 343 later promised that they had heard complaints about the lack of Master Chief in Halo 5, and would renew their focus on the character in the future.

Sales
With hardware included (such as the $500 Halo 5 themed Xbox One) Halo 5 was included in the biggest sales record in Xbox history, though they did not publish software sales or units alone. It was however the best-selling digital title. Within its first five days of release, Halo 5 was the best-selling game of October in the United States, according to NPD Group, which tracks physical sales from retailers. In November, Halo 5 was the eighth best selling game according to NPD's figures.Halo 5: Guardians was the eleventh bestselling retail game during its first week of release in Japan, with 7,455 physical copies. being sold. In the United Kingdom, Halo 5 debuted on the top of the sales charts as measured by Chart-Track, besting the week's other new release, Assassin's Creed Syndicate. It outsold previous Halo release The Master Chief Collection by 50% in its first week. The following week sales decreased 78 percent, and Halo 5 was displaced from the top of the charts by Call of Duty: Black Ops III. The game was the tenth best selling title of 2015 in Australia.

On June 9, 2016, Frank O'Connor said that the game managed to sell 5 million copies in the first 3 months of its release. Halo 5: Guardians is the lowest selling Halo title of the franchise, in the UK.

In a Q&A session, in May 2017, between Michael Pachter and his audience, the gaming analyst recounted his conversation with Microsoft regarding the success of Halo 5. Contrary to popular belief, the analyst says that Microsoft told him that the title sold "on par" with the previous four mainline Halo'' titles.

Awards

References

External links
 
 
 

2015 video games
343 Industries games
First-person shooters
5: Guardians
Video games about mecha
Microsoft games
Multiplayer and single-player video games
Science fiction video games
Video game sequels
Video games developed in the United States
Video games featuring black protagonists
Video games containing loot boxes
Xbox Cloud Gaming games
Xbox One games
Xbox One-only games
Xbox One X enhanced games
Video games using Havok